Australia competed at the 1960 Summer Olympics in Rome, Italy. 189 competitors, 160 men and 29 women, took part in 122 events in 17 sports. Australian athletes have competed in every Summer Olympic Games.

Medalists

Gold
 Herb Elliott — Athletics, Men's 1500 metres
 Lawrence Morgan — Equestrian, Three-Day Event Individual Competition
 Lawrence Morgan, Neale Lavis and Bill Roycroft — Equestrian, Three-Day Event Team Competition
 John Devitt — Swimming, Men's 100 m Freestyle
 Murray Rose — Swimming, Men's 400 m Freestyle
 John Konrads — Swimming, Men's 1500 m Freestyle
 David Theile — Swimming, Men's 100 m Backstroke
 Dawn Fraser — Swimming, Women's 100 m Freestyle

Silver
 Noel Freeman — Athletics, Men's 20 km Walk
 Brenda Jones — Athletics, Women's 800 metres
 Neale Lavis — Equestrian, Three-Day Event Individual Competition
 Neville Hayes — Swimming, Men's 200 m Butterfly
 Murray Rose — Swimming, Men's 1500 m Freestyle
 Janice Andrew, Dawn Fraser, Rosemary Lassig, and Marilyn Wilson — Swimming, Women's 4 × 100 m Medley Relay
 Alva Colquhoun, Dawn Fraser, Lorraine Crapp, and Ilsa Konrads — Swimming, Women's 4 × 100 m Freestyle Relay
 Terry Gathercole, Neville Hayes, Geoffrey Shipton, and David Theile — Swimming, Men's 4 × 100 m Medley Relay

Bronze
 David Power — Athletics, Men's 10000 metres
 Oliver Taylor — Boxing, Men's Bantamweight
 Tony Madigan — Boxing, Men's Light Heavyweight
 John Konrads — Swimming, Men's 400 m Freestyle
 Janice Andrew — Swimming, Women's 100 m Butterfly
 John Devitt, David Dickson, John Konrads, and Murray Rose — Swimming, Men's 4 × 200 m Freestyle Relay

Athletics

Women's 800 metres
Dixie Willis
 Heat — 2:05.9
 Final — did not finish (→ no ranking)

Boxing

Canoeing

Cycling
Len Williams from Coffs Harbour was nominated for the team but declined due to work commitments

Nine male cyclists represented Australia in 1960.

Individual road race
 Frank Brazier
 Alan Grindal
 Garry Jones
 Robert Whetters

Team time trial
 Warren Scarfe
 Garry Jones
 Alan Grindal
 Frank Brazier

Sprint
 Ron Baensch

1000m time trial
 Ian Chapman

Tandem
 Ian Browne
 Geoff Smith

Team pursuit
 Warren Scarfe
 Garry Jones
 Robert Whetters
 Frank Brazier

Diving

Equestrian

Fencing

11 fencers, 9 men and 2 women, represented Australia in 1960.

Men's foil
 Brian McCowage
 Ivan Lund
 Michael Sichel

Men's team foil
 Brian McCowage, Michael Sichel, Zoltan Okalyi, David McKenzie

Men's épée
 Richard Stone
 Keith Hackshall
 John Simpson

Men's team épée
 Ivan Lund, Richard Stone, John Humphreys, John Simpson, Keith Hackshall

Men's sabre
 Michael Sichel
 Keith Hackshall

Women's foil
 Kate Baxter
 Johanna Winter

Gymnastics

Hockey

Modern pentathlon

Three male pentathlete represented Australia in 1960.

Individual
 Neville Sayers
 Hugh Doherty
 Peter Macken

Team
 Neville Sayers
 Hugh Doherty
 Peter Macken

Rowing

Australia had 25 male rowers participate in six out of seven rowing events in 1960.

Men

Sailing

Open

Shooting

Seven shooters represented Australia in 1960.
Men

Swimming

Water polo

Dick Thornett

Weightlifting

Wrestling

References

 

Nations at the 1960 Summer Olympics
1960
Olympics